Dream Lake is a high alpine lake located in Rocky Mountain National Park in northern Colorado, located east of  the continental divide.

The lake is at the base of Hallett Peak and access is via the Bear Lake trail head. It is known for its views caused by surrounding steep cliffs, and is a destination for casual hiking.

Lakes of Rocky Mountain National Park
Protected areas of Larimer County, Colorado
Lakes of Larimer County, Colorado